Agios Andreas Hospital is a hospital in Patras, Achaea, Greece. It is the second largest hospital in the city of Patras and one of the largest in Peloponnese with a total capacity of 400 beds (188 beds in the Internal Medicine sector and 192 beds in the surgical sector).
The hospital occupies 5 buildings of which the 3 are situated close to each other. The main multi-storey building of the hospital (built in 1973) was struck by an earthquake in 2008 and it is completely restored. Additionally, the central building is upgraded with new medical and hotel equipment. The renovated 7-storey building was finally inaugurated in July 2017 after 3 years of delays. This multi-storey building houses the departments of ophthalmology and otorhinolaryngology (7th floor), plastic surgery and urology (6th floor), internal medicine/pathology and cardiology (3rd,4th,5th floor) paediatrics, obstetrics and gynaecology (1st and 2nd floor).
In 2011 the construction of a new wing (two-storey building) was completed and today in houses three clinics: The surgery clinic, the pathology clinic and the orthopaedic clinic.

Notable visits
In January 1997, President Stephanopoulos and Health Minister Geitonas visited the hospital for the opening of its kidney disease wing and library.

Photo gallery

External links
Official website of "Agios Andreas general Hospital" (in Greek)

References

Hospital buildings completed in 1973
Hospital buildings completed in 2011
Hospitals in Greece